Westbrook-Walnut Grove Public School district was formed in the early 1990s when the Westbrook Wildcats and the Walnut Grove Loggers merged to become one school district.  The new mascot is the Chargers.

Basic Information
 Schools = One elementary school (K–6 grades) and one high school (7–12 grades)
 Elementary School is in Walnut Grove and High School is in Westbrook
 Mascot = Chargers
 School Colors = Red and Silver
 ISD No. = 2898

People
 Paul Olson, Current Principal of Walnut Grove's Elementary School
 Sam Woitalewicz, Current Principal of Westbrook's High School
 Loy Woelber, Current Superintendent of WWG

Extracurricular Teams
All of Westbrook-Walnut Grove's Sports Teams are known as the WWG Chargers. WWG's sports/academic teams include football, baseball, softball, wrestling, knowledge bowl, robotics, track, volleyball, and basketball.  WWG also has band available for grades 5–12.  Chorus is required K-8 and encouraged 9-12.

School Transfer
Prior to 2009, there were grades K–4 held in each town. Grades 5–8 were held in Walnut Grove and grades 9–12 were held in Westbrook. Starting at the beginning of the 2009–2010 school year, grades K–6 were all being held in Walnut Grove and grades 7–12 were all being held in Westbrook.

References

Education in Cottonwood County, Minnesota
Education in Redwood County, Minnesota
School districts in Minnesota
School districts established in 1989